James Samuel Glasscock (born November 19, 1931) is an American attorney and politician who served as a member of the  Virginia House of Delegates from 1970 to 1991.

References

Living people
Virginia Democrats
1931 births